Georgiy Olegovich Gorokhov (Russian: Гео́ргий Оле́гович Горо́хов; born 20 April 1993) is a Russian athlete specialising in the pole vault. He competed at the 2015 World Championships in Beijing without qualifying for the final.
 
His personal bests in the event are 5.70 metres outdoors (Moscow 2018) and 5.70 metres indoors (Moscow 2016).

Competition record

See also
 Russia at the 2015 World Championships in Athletics

References

Living people
1993 births
Place of birth missing (living people)
Russian male pole vaulters
World Athletics Championships athletes for Russia
Russian Athletics Championships winners